Salep, also spelled sahlep or ßalaip or sahlab, is a flour made from the tubers of the orchid genus Orchis (including species Orchis mascula and Orchis militaris). These tubers contain a nutritious, starchy polysaccharide called glucomannan. Salep flour is consumed in beverages and desserts, especially in the cuisines of the former Ottoman Empire, notably in the Levant where it is a traditional winter beverage. An increase in consumption is causing local extinctions of orchids in parts of Turkey and Iran.

Etymology

History

The Ancient Romans used ground orchid bulbs to make drinks, which they called by a number of names, especially satyrion and priapiscus. As the names indicate, they likewise considered it to be a powerful aphrodisiac. Of salep, Paracelsus wrote: "behold the Satyrion root, is it not formed like the male privy parts? No one can deny this. Accordingly, magic discovered it and revealed that it can restore a man's virility and passion".

Salep was a popular beverage in the lands of the Ottoman Empire. It enjoyed a reputation as a "fattener" for young women, to make them plumper before marriage.  Its consumption spread beyond there to England and Germany before the rise of coffee and tea, and it was later offered as an alternative beverage in coffee houses. In England, the drink was known as saloop. Popular in the 17th and 18th centuries in England, its preparation required that the salep powder be added to water until thickened whereupon it would be sweetened, then flavored with orange flower or rose water. Substitution of British orchid roots, known as "dogstones", for the original Turkish variants was acceptable in the 18th century.

Saloop

Saloop was a hot drink that was popular in England in the 18th and 19th centuries. Initially, it was made from salep, mostly from Smyrna.  Later, the roots and leaves of the North American sassafras tree were the key ingredient.  This plant thickened the drink and also had a stimulating quality.

This refreshing beverage was sold in place of tea and coffee, which were much more expensive, and was served in a similar way with milk and sugar.

It was used as a remedy for various ailments, including "chronic alcoholic inebriety". Its popularity declined when it was purported to treat venereal disease and so drinking it in public became shameful. Saloop stalls in London were replaced by coffee stalls.

Modern use
The beverage sahlab is now often made with hot milk instead of water. Other desserts are also made from salep flour, including salep pudding and dondurma. The Kahramanmaraş region of Turkey is a major producer of sahlab known as Maraş Salepi. The popularity of sahlab in Turkey has led to a decline in the populations of wild orchids, and it was made illegal to export true salep. Consequently many instant sahlab mixes are made with artificial flavoring. Salep is also drunk in Greece; it is usually sold on the streets as a hot beverage during the cold months of the year. It is very popular in many parts of the Middle East, especially the Levant. Families in Turkey drink the hot version during the winter time.

It is estimated that each year in Turkey, 30 tons of tubers from 38 species are harvested; it takes from 1,000 to 4,000 tubers to make a kilo of flour. With the increasing rarity of some species and local extinctions, traders are harvesting wild orchids in Iran. Abdolbaset Ghorbani of Uppsala University estimates that between 7 and 11 million orchids of nineteen species and sub-species were collected from northern Iran in 2013, with the majority being exported to Turkey. Harvesting of orchid tubers is also increasing in Greece.

In the Middle East, "sahlab" is a hot milk-based winter drink with a pudding-like consistency, sometimes garnished with nuts and cinnamon.

Footnotes

References

Cited texts

External links

 

Arab cuisine
Arabic drinks
Edible thickening agents
Egyptian cuisine
Israeli cuisine
Jordanian cuisine
Lebanese cuisine
Levantine cuisine
Orchis
Palestinian cuisine
Syrian cuisine
Turkish drinks
Bosnia and Herzegovina non-alcoholic drinks
Herbal tea